Olivia Alexander (born Olivia Usey) is an American actress, singer, and Businesswoman born in Louisiana. The daughter of a dance teacher, Olivia began singing and dancing very young. Olivia appeared in national commercials for "Little Debbie's Snack Cakes" and "Ultra Gain Detergent" at the age of 2. Olivia won national dance titles such as, "National Jr. Miss Dance Educators of America" in 1999 and Dance Spirit Magazines "Future Star Award in 2001" . At the age of 13, Alexander moved to Los Angeles to pursue acting and dancing full time. Since then, Alexander has appeared in national commercials, print work, TV shows, and feature films.

Biography

Early life
Olivia Alexander was born in Donaldsonville, Louisiana, as Olivia Usey. As early as age two, she was working as a child print model and commercial actress. After being discovered by a talent agent at a beauty pageant when she was six, Alexander began auditioning in Los Angeles without success. Returning to Los Angeles at the age of thirteen, she eventually appeared in music videos for the Jonas Brothers, Steve Holy, and Jermaine Dupri.

She attended Loyola Marymount University in Los Angeles, where she studied communications.

Acting career
She has played lead roles in Attack of the 50 Foot Cheerleader and 30 Nights of Paranormal Activity With the Devil Inside the Girl With the Dragon Tattoo. Four songs from her debut EP 'Its On' were featured in Attack of the 50 Foot Cheerleader, including the title track 'Attack Attack'.

In 2011, Alexander starred in her own pilot, Love Scouts, for Oxygen. In 2007, she appeared on MTV's Punk'd, Spike TV's Wild World of Spike, and was a finalist on So You Think You Can Dance. She portrayed Brooke in the horror film Old 37, in which she co-starred Mindy White, Bill Moseley and Kane Hodder.

Filmography

References

Living people
21st-century American actresses
Actresses from Louisiana
American female dancers
American film actresses
American television actresses
People from Ascension Parish, Louisiana
Loyola Marymount University alumni
Year of birth missing (living people)